Dorcadion semilineatum is a species of beetle in the family Cerambycidae. It was described by Fairmaire in 1866. It is known from Turkey.

References

semilucens
Beetles described in 1866